

F 

 
 
 
 
 
 
 
 
 1576 Fabiola
 
 
 
 
 
 
 
 
 
 
 
 
 
 
 751 Faïna
 
 
 
 
 
 
 
 
 
 
 
 
 
 
 
 
 
 
 408 Fama
 
 
 1589 Fanatica
 
 
 
 
 
 
 
 
 821 Fanny
 
 
 
 
 
 
 
 
 
 
 
 
 
 
 
 
 
 5256 Farquhar
 
 
 
 
 
 866 Fatme
 
 
 
 
 
 
 
 
 
 
 
 
 
 
 
 
 
 
 
 
 
 
 
 
 
 
 
 
 
 
 
 
 
 
 
 
 
 
 10988 Feinstein
 
 
 
 
 
 294 Felicia
 
 
 
 109 Felicitas
 
 
 
 
 10660 Felixhormuth
 
 
 
 
 
 
 
 
 
 
 
 
 
 1453 Fennia
 
 
 
 1048 Feodosia
 
 
 
 
 
 
 
 
 
 
 
 
 
 
 
 
 72 Feronia
 
 
 
 5201 Ferraz-Mello
 
 
 
 
 
 
 
 
 
 
 
 
 
 
 
 
 
 
 
 
 
 
 
 
 
 
 
 524 Fidelio
 
 37 Fides
 
 380 Fiducia
 
 
 
 
 
 
 1099 Figneria
 
 
 5316 Filatov
 
 2892 Filipenko
 
 
 
 
 
 
 795 Fini
 
 
 
 
 
 
 
 
 
 
 
 
 
 
 
 
 
 
 
 
 
 
 
 
 
 
 1021 Flammario
 
 
 
 
 
 
 
 
 
 
 
 
 
 
 
 
 
 
 
 
 1736 Floirac
 
 8 Flora
 
 
 
 3122 Florence
 
 321 Florentina
 
 
 
 1689 Floris-Jan
 
 
 
 
 
 
 2181 Fogelin
 
 
 
 
 
 
 
 
 
 
 
 
 
 
 
 
 
 
 
 
 
 
 
 
 
 
 
 
 
 
 1054 Forsytia
 
 
 
 
 19 Fortuna
 
 
 
 
 
 
 
 
 
 20898 Fountainhills
 
 
 
 
 
 
 
 1105 Fragaria
 
 
 
 
 
 
 
 
 
 
 
 
 1212 Francette
 
 
 
 
 
 
 
 
 
 
 
 
 
 
 
 
 
 
 
 
 
 
 
 
 
 
 
 
 
 
 
 
 
 
 
 
 
 
 40463 Frankkameny
 
 1925 Franklin-Adams
 982 Franklina
 
 
 
 
 
 
 
 
 
 
 
 
 
 
 
 
 
 
 3917 Franz Schubert
 862 Franzia
 520 Franziska
 
 
 
 
 
 
 
 
 309 Fraternitas
 
 
 
 
 
 1093 Freda
 
 
 
 17473 Freddiemercury
 
 678 Fredegundis
 
 
 
 
 
 
 
 
 
 
 
 
 
 
 
 
 
 
 
 76 Freia
 
 
 
 
 
 
 
 
 
 
 
 
 
 
 
 
 
 
 
 
 
 
 722 Frieda
 
 
 3642 Frieden
 538 Friederike
 
 
 
 
 77 Frigga
 
 
 709 Fringilla
 
 
 
 1253 Frisia
 
 
 10979 Fristephenson
 
 
 
 
 
 
 
 
 
 
 
 
 
 
 
 
 854 Frostia
 
 
 
 
 
 
 
 
 
 
 
 
 
 3996 Fugaku
 
 
 
 
 
 
 
 
 
 
 
 
 
 
 
 
 
 
 
 
 
 
 
 
 3915 Fukushima
 
 
 
 
 
 
 609 Fulvia
 
 
 
 
 
 
 
 
 
 
 
 
 
 
 
 
 
 7505 Furusho

See also 
 List of minor planet discoverers
 List of observatory codes

References 
 

Lists of minor planets by name